Federico Carraro (born 23 June 1992) is an Italian footballer who plays for Serie C club Feralpisalò as an attacking midfielder.

Club career
Carraro started his career with Padova youth teams, before joining Fiorentina academy in 2006. He made his debut for the first squad of Fiorentina on 14 January 2010, when he came on as a substitute in the 81st minute for Khouma Babacar in a Coppa Italia game against ChievoVerona. On January 20, he came on as a substitute again, this time in the quarterfinal against Lazio. On 16 May 2010 he made his Serie A debut, when he came on as a substitute for Adem Ljajić in the 65th minute of the game against Bari.

The following season, he played for the first time as a starter in the Coppa Italia game against Reggina on 30 November 2010.

He moved to Serie B club Modena on loan for the 2011–12 season. On 30 August 2011 he made his debut in the home match lost 1–0 against Bari.

On 31 January 2012 he moved on loan to Pro Vercelli. On 17 July 2012 extended his contract for another year at the Serie B club.

On 11 January 2013 he moved on loan to Gavorrano.

On 24 July 2013 Pavia buy the co-ownership from Fiorentina.

On 20 June 2014 Pavia buy the other part of co-ownership from Fiorentina.

On 12 July 2019 he joined Feralpisalò on a 3-year contract.

International career
He represented the Italy U-17 team at the 2009 FIFA U-17 World Cup and scored 2 goals in the tournament.

Career statistics

Club

References

External links

1992 births
Living people
Sportspeople from Padua
Italian footballers
Association football midfielders
Serie A players
Serie B players
Serie C players
Serie D players
ACF Fiorentina players
Modena F.C. players
F.C. Pro Vercelli 1892 players
U.S. Gavorrano players
F.C. Pavia players
S.S. Teramo Calcio players
Imolese Calcio 1919 players
FeralpiSalò players
Italy youth international footballers
Footballers from Veneto